Kultar Singh Sandhwan (Punjabi: ਕੁਲਤਾਰ ਸਿੰਘ ਸੰਧਵਾਂ) is an Indian politician who is currently serving as the 18th and current Speaker of the Punjab Legislative Assembly from 21 March 2022. He is also MLA representing the Kotkapura Assembly constituency. He is a member of the Aam Aadmi Party. He is the current speaker of the Punjab Legislative Assembly.

Member of Legislative Assembly

First term (2017-2022)
Committee assignments of 15th Punjab Legislative Assembly                                                       
Chairman;Public Accounts Committee 
 Member (2017-2019) Library Committee
 Member Committee on Subordinate Legislation
 Member (2021-2022) Committee on Papers laid/to be laid on the table and Library

Second term (2022-present)
The Aam Aadmi Party gained a strong 79% majority in the Sixteenth Punjab Legislative Assembly by winning 92 out of 117 seats in the 2022 Punjab Legislative Assembly election. MP Bhagwant Mann was sworn in as Chief Minister on 16 March 2022.

He was elected as the speaker of the 16th Punjab Assembly.

Electoral performance

References 

Living people
Punjab, India MLAs 2022–2027
Aam Aadmi Party politicians from Punjab, India
Punjab, India MLAs 2017–2022
1975 births